Luis Fernando da Graça Loureiro (born 4 December 1976) is a Portuguese football coach and a former defensive midfielder. He is the manager of Vitória de Setúbal.

He amassed Primeira Liga totals of 142 matches and 15 goals over seven seasons, representing mainly Gil Vicente. He also competed professionally in Russia and Cyprus.

In 2011, Loureiro started working as a coach.

Playing career

Club
Loureiro was born in Sintra, Lisbon Region. Having started his footballing career with his hometown club S.U. Sintrense, he went on to represent Portimonense SC, C.D. Nacional, Gil Vicente FC (making his Primeira Liga debut in the 2001–02 season), S.C. Braga, Sporting CP and C.F. Estrela da Amadora, also having uneventful abroad stints with FC Dynamo Moscow in Russia (February–July 2005) and Cyprus's Anorthosis Famagusta FC (August–December 2007).

Arguably, Loureiro's biggest career moment came with Sporting: a spectacular goal, topping a great performance in a 2–1 home win against S.L. Benfica during the 2005–06 campaign. However, he was never more than a utility player at the Estádio José Alvalade, making only 14 appearances in all competitions and leaving by mutual consent.

Loureiro left Anorthosis in December 2007 after having arrived in the summer, following some injury problems and a serious run-in with manager Temuri Ketsbaia. The former returned to Portugal the following month, signing until the end of the season with Boavista FC.

In August 2008, after Boavista's top-flight relegation, Loureiro also dropped down a level, returning to Algarve's Portimonense and being released at the end of the campaign. After one year out of football he re-joined his first professional team Sintrense, in the fourth division.

International
Loureiro earned six caps for Portugal, all in 2003 and as a Gil Vicente player. His first came in the 1–0 loss to Italy on 12 February in a friendly, and he last played in a 4–0 win over Bolivia on 10 June, in another exhibition game.

Coaching career
Starting in 2011, Loureiro managed Sintrense, C.D. Fatima, S.U. 1º Dezembro and Casa Pia AC, all in the third tier. He was appointed at the last of them in February 2019, and won promotion on the away goals rule against S.C. Praiense before taking the championship title on 23 June with a penalty shootout win over U.D. Vilafranquense at the Estádio Nacional; in between, he spent 2017–18 at the helm of US Lusitanos Saint-Maur in the French Championnat National 2.

For ending Casa Pia's 55-year absence from the LigaPro, Loureiro was given another year on his contract. In his first match managing in the competition, on 10 August 2019, the team lost 3–1 at S.C. Farense. He was dismissed on 24 September with the side second from bottom, just after winning for the first time in the season.

Loureiro continued working in division three the following years, with S.C.U. Torreense, Real S.C. and Vitória de Setúbal.

References

External links

1976 births
Living people
People from Sintra
Sportspeople from Lisbon District
Portuguese footballers
Association football midfielders
Primeira Liga players
Liga Portugal 2 players
Segunda Divisão players
S.U. Sintrense players
Portimonense S.C. players
C.D. Nacional players
Gil Vicente F.C. players
S.C. Braga players
Sporting CP footballers
C.F. Estrela da Amadora players
Boavista F.C. players
Russian Premier League players
FC Dynamo Moscow players
Cypriot First Division players
Anorthosis Famagusta F.C. players
Portugal B international footballers
Portugal international footballers
Portuguese expatriate footballers
Expatriate footballers in Russia
Expatriate footballers in Cyprus
Portuguese expatriate sportspeople in Russia
Portuguese expatriate sportspeople in Cyprus
Portuguese football managers
Liga Portugal 2 managers
S.U. Sintrense managers
C.D. Fátima managers
Vitória F.C. managers
Portuguese expatriate football managers
Expatriate football managers in France
Portuguese expatriate sportspeople in France